Murat Çetinkaya (born 1976) is an economist, who was Governor of the Central Bank of the Republic of Turkey from April 2016 to July 2019. He is the first central-bank governor to be fired in Turkey since the 1981 military coup.

Early life
He was born in Çorlu, Tekirdağ Province in 1976. He is of mixed Albanian and Turkish origin. After finishing high school in Tekirdağ, Murat Çetinkaya was educated in International Relations at Boğaziçi University in Istanbul.

Career
Çetinkaya began his banking career at Albaraka Türk, where he served in several positions in the departments of foreign transactions, treasury and corresponding banks. In 2003, he transferred to state-owned Halkbank. He worked in international banking and structured finance departments, and was ultimately promoted to vice general manager of the bank. From 2006 on, he served as board member of the Halk Investment and Security Bank, a subsidiary of the Halkbank. By January 2008, he joined Kuwait Türk Bank, where he became vice general manager responsible for treasury, international finance and investment banking.

Çetinkaya was appointed vice governor of the Central Bank of Turkey on 29 June 2012. On 19 April 2016 he succeeded Erdem Başçı as governor of the Central Bank, who retired after completing his five-year official term.

References

1976 births
People from Çorlu
Boğaziçi University alumni
Turkish civil servants
Governors of the Central Bank of Turkey
Living people